Jannathul Uloom Arabic College (JUAC) also called Jannathul Uloom  is a religious educational institute of sunni muslims located at Valiyangadi near Palakkad town. It was established In 1967 by Shaikhuna E.K. Hasan Musliyar, and was Kerala's second Islamic Arabic College established by Sunni Muslims after Jami'a Nooriyya Arabic College Pattikkad and first in the Palakkad district

Curriculum 
Language is a barrier for scholars of Islam. Therefore, the 'ULOOMI' course teaches Arabic, Urdu, English and Malayalam. Jannathul Uloom offers an eight-year course that integrates religious education with general subjects. The basic eight-year course is divided into three stages - a three-year secondary course, a two-year Senior Secondary course, a three-year Degree course. It is compulsory for every student to pursue an official degree course in any of the arts or commerce subjects from any recognized University. After the completion of these eight years students will be awarded the Moulavi Fadhil ULOOMI Certificate and get eligibility to join Jami'a Nooriyya Arabic College for a Faizy Degree. The syllabus includes religious subjects such as Quran, Tajweed, Hadith, Usul ul-Hadith, Fiqh, Usul ul-Fiqh, Aqeeda, Tasawwuf, Nahvu, Sarf, Mantiq, Balagha and comparative studies of various religions, as well as secular subjects like Maths, Social Sciences, History, Physics, Chemistry and Biology as well as PSC-approved certified computer courses since 1999.

Library 
JUAC has well-equipped library with good collection of books including Islamic studies, Islamic history, English, Arabic, Malayalam, literature, etc., and subscribes to many periodicals in different languages.

Admission process 
All boys who have successfully completed primary education from any recognized SKIMVB madrasa and formal school are eligible to attend the entrance examination conducted by JUAC. Admission is based on merits in the oral and written entrance examination. Special entrance examinations are  also conducted by JUAC for muqthasar batch (one-year) in every academic year.

Principals 
 Shaikhuna EK Hasan Musliyar (1967–78)
 Shaikhuna CKM Swadiq Musliyar
 Shaikhuna Kidangazhi Abdurahman Musliyar
 Shaikhuna Karakkunnu P Muhammad Musliyar
 Shaikhuna MC Abdullah Musliyar Aripra (1997–98)
 Shaikhuna AP Muhammad musliyar Kumaramputhoor
 Shaikhuna Nattika V Moosa Musliyar (1996-96)
 Shaikhuna Anamagad Aabdurahman Musliyar (1996–97) (1998-2000)
 Shaikhuna Rasheed Faizy Chemmala (2000–2002)

Now principal is Usthad NA Hussain Mannani, since 2002

Student activities 
Jannathu Thwalaba Studend's Association (JTSA) is students' union of JUAC. It make laborious effort to nourish and creativity and potential of students. It has made a fruitful journey by upbringing the status of students and institution. It has many sub wings to control different kinds of activities in different fields such as da'wa activities in coimbatore and palakkad areas

Alumni 
Alumnies of Jannathul Uloom Welfare Association (AJWA) is the alumni association and backbone of JUAC. They are scholars who completed the course from this college. The union keeps all promises of institution and works well to serve the community and conducts many programs like seminars and debates. Main obligation of this association is to keep all alumni to community related activities.

Notable alumni 
1. Hakeem Faizy Adrussery, Rector of CIC

2. Sayyid PK Imbichikkoya Thangal Pazhayalakkidi, SYS State vice president

3. Ustad Rasheed Faizy Chemmala, Former Principal of JUAC

References

External links 

Religious schools in India
Schools in Palakkad district
Colleges in Kerala